The 1900 Home Nations Championship was the eighteenth series of the rugby union Home Nations Championship. Six matches were played between 6 January and 17 March. It was contested by England, Ireland, Scotland and Wales.

Table

Results

Scoring system
The matches for this season were decided on points scored. A try was worth three points, while converting a kicked goal from the try gave an additional two points. A dropped goal and a goal from mark were both worth four points. Penalty goals were worth three points.

The matches

England vs. Wales

England: Gamlin (Devonport Albion), SF Coopper (Blackheath), GW Gordon-Smith (Blackheath), AT Brettargh (Liverpool OB), Elliot Nicholson (Birkenhead Park), RHB Cattell (Moseley) capt., GH Marsden (Morley), James Baxter (Birkenhead Park), A Cockerham (Bradford Olicana), Wallace Jarman (Bristol), CT Scott (Cambridge Uni), FJ Bell (Northern), Robert William Bell (Cambridge Uni), S Reynolds (Richmond), W Cobby (Hull)

Wales: Billy Bancroft (Swansea) capt., Llewellyn (Llwynypia), Dan Rees (Swansea), George Davies (Swansea), Billy Trew (Swansea), Lou Phillips (Newport), Llewellyn Lloyd (Newport), Bob Thomas (Swansea), Jere Blake (Cardiff), William Williams (Pontymister), Fred Miller (Mountain Ash), Alfred Brice (Aberavon), Jehoida Hodges (Newport), George Boots (Newport), Dick Hellings (Llwynypia)

Wales vs. Scotland

Wales: Billy Bancroft (Swansea) capt., Llewellyn (Llwynypia), Gwyn Nicholls (Cardiff), George Davies (Swansea), Billy Trew (Swansea), Lou Phillips (Newport), Llewellyn Lloyd (Newport), Bob Thomas (Swansea), Jere Blake (Cardiff), William Williams (Pontymister), Fred Miller (Mountain Ash), Alfred Brice (Aberavon), Jehoida Hodges (Newport), George Boots (Newport), George Dobson (Cardiff)

Scotland: H Rottenburg (London Scottish), JE Crabbie (Edinburgh Acads), WH Morrison (Edinburgh Acads), Alec Boswell Timms (Edinburgh Uni), T Scott (Langholm), Jimmy Gillespie (Edinburgh Acads), FH Fasson (London Scottish), John Dykes (London Scottish), GC Kerr (Edingburugh Wands), WMC McEwan (Edinburgh Acads) TM Scott (Hawick), Mark Coxon Morrison (Royal HSFP) capt., FW Henderson (London Scottish), WJ Thomson (West of Scotland), David Bedell-Sivright (Cambridge Uni)

England vs. Ireland

England: Gamlin (Devonport Albion), GC Robinson (Percy Park), GW Gordon-Smith (Blackheath), JT Taylor (Castleford), Elliot Nicholson (Birkenhead Park), JC Marquis (Birkenhead Park), GH Marsden (Morley), James Baxter(Birkenhead Park), JH Shooter (Morley), John Daniell (Cambridge Uni) capt., CT Scott (Cambridge Uni), H Alexander (Birkenhead Park), Robert William Bell (Cambridge Uni), S Reynolds (Richmond), Alexander Todd (Blackheath)

Ireland: PE O'Brien-Butler (Monkstown), Gerry Doran (Lansdowne), C Reid (NIFC), JB Allison (Queen's Uni, Belfast), Edward Fitzhardinge Campbell (Monkstown), Louis Magee (Bective Rangers) capt., JH Ferris (Queen's Uni, Belfast), F Gardiner (NIFC), M Ryan (Rockwell College), Samuel Irwin (Queen's Uni, Belfast), CE Allen (Derry), PC Nicholson (Dublin U), Arthur Meares (Dublin U), Jim Sealy (Dublin U), JJ Coffey (Lansdowne)

Ireland vs. Scotland

Ireland: Cecil Boyd (Dublin U), Gerry Doran (Lansdowne), BRW Doran (Lansdowne), JB Allison (Queen's Uni, Belfast), IG Davidson (NIFC), Louis Magee (Bective Rangers) capt., JH Ferris (Queen's Uni, Belfast), F Gardiner (NIFC), M Ryan (Rockwell College), HAS Irvine (?), CE Allen (Derry), PC Nicholson (Dublin U), TJ Little (Bective Rangers), Jim Sealy (Dublin U), J Ryan (Rockwell College)

Scotland: H Rottenburg (London Scottish), WH Welsh (Edinburgh Acads), AR Smith (London Scottish), Alec Boswell Timms (Edinburgh Uni), T Scott (Langholm), RT Nielson (West of Scotland), JT Mabon (Jed-Forest), John Dykes (London Scottish), GC Kerr (Edingburugh Wands), James Greenlees (Cambridge Uni), TM Scott (Hawick) capt., JA Campbell (Cambridge Uni), FW Henderson (London Scottish), WP Scott (West of Scotland), R Scott (Hawick)

Scotland vs. England

Scotland: H Rottenburg (London Scottish), WH Welsh (Edinburgh Acads), AR Smith (London Scottish), GT Campbell (London Scottish), T Scott (Langholm), RT Nielson (West of Scotland), Jimmy Gillespie (Edinburgh Acads), LHI Bell (Edinburgh Acads), GC Kerr (Edinburgh Wands), WMC McEwan (Edinburgh Acads), A MacKinnon (London Scottish), Mark Coxon Morrison (Royal HSFP) capt., HO Smith (Watsonians), WP Scott (West of Scotland), R Scott (Hawick)

England: HT Gamlin (Devonport Albion), GC Robinson (Percy Park), GW Gordon-Smith (Blackheath), WL Bunting (Moseley), R Forrest (Wellington), JC Marquis (Birkenhead Park), GH Marsden (Morley), James Baxter (Birkenhead Park), JH Shooter (Morley), John Daniell (Cambridge Uni) capt., AFC Luxmoore (Richmond), H Alexander (Birkenhead Park), Robert William Bell (Cambridge Uni), S Reynolds (Richmond), Alexander Todd (Blackheath)

Ireland vs. Wales

Ireland: J Fulton (NIFC), EF Campbell (Monkstown), BRW Doran (Lansdowne), JB Allison (Queen's Uni, Belfast), IG Davidson (NIFC), Louis Magee (Bective Rangers) capt., JH Ferris (Queen's Uni, Belfast), Arthur Meares (Wanderers), M Ryan (Rockwell College), Samuel Irwin (Queen's Uni, Belfast), CE Allen (Derry), PC Nicholson (Dublin U), TJ Little (Bective Rangers), Thomas Arnold Harvey (Dublin U), J Ryan (Rockwell College)

Wales: Billy Bancroft (Swansea) capt., Llewellyn (Llwynypia), Gwyn Nicholls (Cardiff), George Davies (Swansea), Billy Trew (Swansea), Lou Phillips (Newport), Selwyn Biggs (Cardiff), Bob Thomas (Swansea), Jere Blake (Cardiff), William Williams (Pontymister), Fred Miller (Mountain Ash), Alfred Brice (Aberavon), Jehoida Hodges (Newport), George Boots (Newport), Dick Hellings (Penygraig)

Sources

External links

1898-99
1899–1900 in British rugby union
1899–1900 in English rugby union
rugby union
rugby union
1900 rugby union tournaments for national teams
Home Nations Championship
Home Nations Championship
Home Nations Championship
1899–1900 in Scottish rugby union